Tokelauan people are a Polynesian ethnic group native to Tokelau, a Polynesian archipelago in the Pacific Ocean, who share the Tokelauan Polynesian culture, history and language.

The group's home islands are a dependent territory of New Zealand. 77% of Tokelau's population of 1,650 claims Tokelauan ancestry, while 8,676 Tokelauans live in New Zealand. A small number also live in Samoa.

Language
The Tokelauan language is part of the Polynesian language family. Most Tokelauans are fluent in both English and Tokelauan. There are approximately 4,000 speakers, the majority of whom live in New Zealand.

Diaspora
The majority of Tokelauans live in New Zealand, concentrated in the large Wellington suburbs of the Hutt Valley and Porirua, as well as Auckland. They are the sixth largest Pacific Islander ethnic group in New Zealand, and one of the most socio-economically deprived. Migration to New Zealand began in the 1950s and increased in the 1960s under a government resettlement scheme driven by fears of overpopulation and a tropical cyclone striking the islands. The New Zealand-based population exceeded that of Tokelau in 1976, and immigration declined after that point.

Culture

Religion
As of 2019, 50.4% of people belong to Congregational Christian Church while 38.7% belong to Catholic church. The rest of the population adhere to various Christian denomination such as Presbyterian. Roman Catholicism is mostly practiced in Nukunonu whereas inhabitants of the islands of Atafu and Fakaofo adhere to the Congregationalism. Prior to the arrival of Christianity, Tokelauans worshiped a god named Tui Tokelau.

Sports
Netball, rugby, football and cricket are popular in Tokelau. Tokelau Games are held yearly.

References

Ethnic groups in New Zealand
Ethnic groups in Samoa